The following is a list of architects from the country of Portugal.

Nadir Afonso (1920–2013)
Carlos Amarante (1748–1815)
João Antunes (1642–1712)
Diogo de Arruda (before 1490–1531)
Diogo de Boitaca (c. 1460–1528?)
Cassiano Branco (1897–1970)
Gonçalo Byrne (b. 1941)
João Luís Carrilho da Graça (b. 1952)
Jorge Ferreira Chaves (1920–1981)
Pancho Guedes (1925–2015)
Francisco Keil do Amaral (1910–1975)
Raul Lino (1879–1974)
José Marques da Silva (1869–1947)
Maria José Marques da Silva (1914–1996)
Filipe Oliveira Dias (1963–2014)
Jacobetty Rosa (1901–1970)
João Santa-Rita (b. 1960)
Álvaro Siza (b. 1933), Pritzker Prize winner
Eduardo Souto de Moura (b.1952), Pritzker Prize winner
Tomás Taveira (b. 1938)
Fernando Távora (1923–2005)
Pedro Nunes Tinoco (d. 1641)

See also

 Architecture of Portugal
 List of architects
 List of Portuguese people

Portuguese
Architects